Martin Hicks (born 27 February 1957) is a former footballer who played in the Football League as a
defender for Reading and Birmingham City. He made 500 League appearances for Reading.

Hicks holds the record for the highest number of first team appearances by a Reading player, making a total of 603 first team appearances.

In a 2005 fans' vote to compile Reading's best-ever eleven, Hicks was voted on the team as one of the centre backs.

Between March and August 1979, Hicks was one of the Reading back five that kept a clean sheet for 1,103 minutes – a record that stood until broken by Manchester United.

After leaving Reading he joined Birmingham City, and was their Player of the Year for 1992.

References

1957 births
Living people
People from Stratford-upon-Avon
English footballers
Association football defenders
Stratford Town F.C. players
Charlton Athletic F.C. players
Reading F.C. players
Birmingham City F.C. players
Newbury Town F.C. players